Euglandina vanuxemensis, is a species of predatory air-breathing land snail, a carnivorous terrestrial pulmonate gastropod mollusk in the family Spiraxidae.

References 

Spiraxidae
Gastropods described in 1834